Târgșoru Vechi is a commune in Prahova County, Muntenia, Romania. It is composed of four villages: Stăncești, Strejnicu (commune seat), Târgșoru Vechi, and Zahanaua.

On its site was located the medieval former town of Târgșor.

Strejnicu village is the assassination site of historian and politician Nicolae Iorga, who was killed on November 27, 1940 by an Iron Guard squad.

References

Communes in Prahova County
Localities in Muntenia